The following lists events that happened during :1841 in New Zealand.

Population
The estimated population of New Zealand at the end of 1841 is 78,400 Māori and 5000 non-Māori.

Incumbents

Regal and viceregal
Head of State – Queen Victoria
Governor of New South Wales – Sir George Gipps (overall responsibility for New Zealand until 3 May)
Governor – Captain William Hobson (Lieutenant- Governor until 3 May then Governor)

Government and law
Chief Justice – William Martin is appointed the first Chief Justice of New Zealand on 5 February but does not arrive in New Zealand until August.

Events
31 March: The William Bryan arrives at Taranaki from Plymouth bearing 148 settlers to found New Plymouth.
 March: Captain Rhodes builds the first wharf in Wellington, in front of his store on the Wellington waterfront.
 3 May: In anticipation of the Great Charter coming into force, William Hobson is sworn in as Governor of New Zealand.
 1 July: Colony of New Zealand comes into existence, a separate Crown colony from New South Wales.
 10 July:  The New Zealand Herald and Auckland Gazette begins publication. The newspaper lasts less than a year.
 27 September: Foundation of a school for Catholic boys, the first school in Auckland.
 29 October: the settler ship Brilliant arrives at Cornwallis, New Zealand from the British Isles, however the passengers find bare land at the promised location of the settlement.
8 November: The Auckland Chronicle and New Zealand Colonist begins publishing. It continues with some gaps until 1845.

Undated
 The Capital of New Zealand is moved from Okiato (Old Russell) to Auckland.
 The first recorded mining in New Zealand as outcrops of manganese are mined on the coast of Kawau Island.
George Selwyn is created the first Anglican Bishop of New Zealand.

Sport

Horse racing
 January: A hurdle race is run in January at Te Aro Pā, Wellington.

Unknown date
 The Auckland Town Plate is contested at Epsom Downs. A committee of army officers and townspeople forms to control racing in Auckland (Epsom). (see also 1849).

Yachting
January: The first sailing regatta in the country is held as part of Anniversary celebrations in Wellington.

Births

 20 January (in England): William Steward, politician
 28 February: John Duthie, politician and Mayor of Wellington
 9 March (in Switzerland): Henry Suter, zoologist

Unknown date

 James McGowan, politician

Deaths
 23 November: William Cornwallis Symonds, prominent early colonist

See also
List of years in New Zealand
Timeline of New Zealand history
History of New Zealand
Military history of New Zealand
Timeline of the New Zealand environment
Timeline of New Zealand's links with Antarctica

References